The 29th World Orienteering Championships was held in Lausanne, Switzerland, from 14 to 21 July 2012.

Medalists

Men

Women

Participating countries
A total of 46 countries participated at this World Championships.

Results

Sprint
The sprint finals were held on 14 July 2012 at Lausanne-Ouchy.

Men's sprint

Women's sprint

Middle distance
The middle distance finals were held on 17 July 2012 at St-Cergue / La Givrine.

Men's middle distance

Women's middle distance

Long distance
The long distance finals were held on 19 July 2012 at Chalet-à-Gobet.

Men's long distance

Women's long distance

Relay
The relay events were held on 21 July 2012 at Chalet-à-Gobet.

Men's relay

Women's relay

References

2012 World Orienteering Championships
2012 in Swiss sport
International sports competitions hosted by Switzerland
Sports competitions in Lausanne
July 2012 sports events in Europe
Orienteering in Switzerland